The 84th Fighter Wing is an inactive United States Air Force unit. Its last assignment was with the IX Tactical Air Command, based at Brunswick, Germany. It was inactivated on 12 August 1945.

History
Established and organized at Blumenthal Field, North Carolina in 1943 as a command and control organization.   Deployed to the European Theater of Operations (ETO) in early 1944 and assigned to IX Fighter Command, Ninth Air Force.  Initial Mission of the Wing was to receive operational orders from Headquarters, IX Fighter Command and direct subordinate groups in attacking enemy targets in Occupied France and the Low Countries in preparation for the Normandy Invasion in June 1944.    Targets included bridges, roads, railroads and enemy interceptor aircraft both on the ground as well as in air-to-air combat.

After the D-Day invasion, was reassigned to IX Tactical Air Command (IX TAC) and directed to provide ground support for advancing United States First Army forces in France, attacking enemy targets initially in the Cotentin Peninsula, then supported Operation Cobra, the breakout of Normandy and attacked enemy forces in the Falaise-Argentan Gap. Wing headquarters and subordinate units operated primarily from liberated airfields and newly built temporary Advanced Landing Grounds in France, moved into north-central France, its groups attacking enemy targets near Paris then north-west into Belgium and the southern Netherlands.   In December 1944/January 1945, engaged enemy targets on the north side of the Battle of the Bulge, then moved eastward into the Northern Rhineland as part of the Western Allied invasion of Germany.

Supported First Army as it crossed the Rhine River at Remagen then moved north to attack ground targets in the Ruhr, providing air support as Allied ground forces encircled enemy forces in the Ruhr Pocket, essentially ending organized enemy resistance in Western Germany.   First Army halted its advance at the Elbe River in late April 1945, the wing engaging targets of opportunity in enemy-controlled areas until combat was ended on 5 May 1945.

Remained in Europe after the war as part of United States Air Forces in Europe, performing occupation duty and the destruction or shipment to the United States of captured enemy combat equipment.   Personnel demobilized and was inactivated in Germany in August 1945.

Operations and decorations
 Combat Operations:  Combat in European Theater of Operations (ETO), 29 January 1944-May 1945.
 Campaigns: Air Offensive, Europe ;Normandy; Northern France; Rhineland; Ardennes-Alsace; Central Europe
 Decorations: Cited in the Order of the Day, Belgian Army: 6 Jun-30 Sep 1944; 1 Oct 1944-; Dec 1944-Jan 1945. Belgian Fourragere.

Lineage
 Constituted as 84th Fighter Wing on 4 November 1943
 Activated on 10 November 1943
 Disbanded on 12 August 1945.

Assignments
 Third Air Force, 10 November 1943 – 29 January 1944
 IX Fighter Command, 29 January – 30 April 1944
 IX Tactical Air Command, 30 April 1944 – 12 August 1945

Components
Attached to IX Tactical Air Command entire time

 50th Fighter Group: (P-47 Thunderbolt), 7 April-12 August 1944
 365th Fighter Group: (P-47 Thunderbolt), 1 August-1 October 1944
 404th Fighter Group: (P-47 Thunderbolt), 1 August-26 October 1944

Stations

 Bluethenthal Field, North Carolina, 10 November 1943 – 1 January 1944
 RAF Keevil (AAF-471), England, 29 January 1944
 RAF Beaulieu (AAF-408), England, 4 March 1944
 Houesville, France, 19 June 1944
 Cricqueville Airfield (A-2), France, 2 August 1944
 Aillières-Beauvoir, France, 30 August 1944
 Saint-Quentin, France, 12 September 1944

 Vermand, France, 17 September 1944
 Arlon, Belgium, 1 October 1944
 Maastricht Airfield (Y-44), Netherlands, 22 October 1944
 Munchen-Gladbach Airfield (Y-56), Germany, 8 March 1945
 Haltern, Germany, 3 April 1945
 Gutersloh Airfield (Y-99), Germany, 14 April 1945
 Brunswick/Broitzem Airfield (R-38), Germany, 22 April – 12 August 1945

References

 Maurer, Maurer (1983). Air Force Combat Units of World War II. Maxwell AFB, Alabama: Office of Air Force History. .
 Johnson, David C. (1988), U.S. Army Air Forces Continental Airfields (ETO), D-Day to V-E Day; Research Division, USAF Historical Research Center, Maxwell AFB, Alabama.

External links

Military units and formations established in 1943
084
Military units and formations disestablished in 1945